The Supro Ozark 1560 S is a vintage electric guitar. It employed a single pickup near the bridge. The guitar is most famous for being the first electric guitar Jimi Hendrix owned.

Jimi Hendrix 
His white Supro Ozark was from his father, who purchased it from Myers Music shop in Seattle in 1958. It was the first electric guitar Hendrix owned. Hendrix's first gig was with an unnamed band in the Jaffe Room of Seattle's Temple De Hirsch, but they fired him between sets for showing off. He joined the Rocking Kings, which played professionally at venues such as the Birdland club. His guitar was stolen after he left it backstage overnight.

Revival 
It was recreated by Roy Dalvin in December, 1990.

Other notable players 
 Ry Cooder
 Jackson Browne
 Aerosmith

References

Electric guitars